Iver Kleive (born 25 May 1949 in Skien, Norway) is a Norwegian composer and organist. He is known for his composing style which is a fusion of traditional church music with other musical idioms such as blues, jazz, and Norwegian folk music. He has appeared in nearly 200 recordings as a studio musician, composer and arranger.

Biography 
Kleive was born in Skien to a musical family. His father, Kristoffer Kleive, was also an organist and his brother, Audun Kleive, is a noted jazz percussionist. He studied church music and organ at the Norwegian Academy of Music in Oslo and then served as the organist at the Frogner Church from 1976 to 1981 and the Røyken Church from 1982 to 1985. Since 1987 he has been the musical director of the Helgerud Church in Bærum. He is also director of the Oslo Bach Choir which he founded in 1988. The recording of his Blå koral (Blue Chorale) won a Spellemannprisen in 1991.

Principal discography 
Klieve records primarily on the Kirkelig Kulturverksted label (KKV). His principal recordings include:

Solo albums 
1988: Max Reger – Inferno, Symphonic Fantasia and Fugue for organ, Op. 57 (KKV)
1993: Max Reger – Alle Menschen müssen sterben, Chorale fantasia, Op. 52/1 (KKV)
1994: Kyrie (KKV)
1998: Juleevangeliet / The Christmas Gospel (KKV)
2004: Hyrdenes Tilbedelse / Adoration of the Shepherds (KKV), meditations over famous Christmas songs
2007: Requiem (KKV)

 Collaborative works 

With Ingrid Elisabeth Johansen
1978: Ingrid Elisabeth (Sonet Records)

With Øystein Sunde
1979: Hærtata Hørt (Philips Records)

With Ole Paus
1981: Å, Sonja (Zarepta Records)

With Ove Røsbak and Sigmund Groven
1981: Lævandes Dikt (Viton)

With Per Egil Hovland
1983: Med Røtter I Himmelen (KKV)

With Roar Engelberg
1985: Alveland (KKV)

With Knut Reiersrud
1991: Blå Koral / Blue Chorale (KKV)
1996: Himmelskip / Ship of Heaven (KKV)
2000: Den Signede Dag / The Blessed Day (KKV), feat. folk singer Povl Dissing
2008: De Usynlige (2L), arranging and playing most of the soundtrack of the film "deUSYNLIGE" (N/SE/D)
2006: Nåde Over Nåde / Grace of Grace (KKV)

With Jonas Fjeld
1993: Texas Jensen (Stageway Records)

With Annbjørg Lien
1994: Felefeber (Grappa Music)

With Sigmund Groven
2001: Innunder Jul (Grappa Music)
2010: HarmOrgan (2L)

With Terje Rypdal
2002: Lux Aeterna (ECM Records), recorded in 2000

With Aage Kvalbein
2007: Julemeditasjoner / Christmas Meditations (KKV)
2008: Til Trøst / The Comforter (KKV)

With Sondre Bratland
1988: Inn i draumen 
1992: Roså frå Betlehem 

With Knut Reiersrud and Povl Dissing
2013: Som Den Gylne Sol (KKV)

 Notes and references 

 Sources 
Dalane, Anders, "Iver Kleive", Store norske leksikon 
Ellingham, Mark et al. (eds), World Music: Africa, Europe and the Middle East, Rough Guides, 1999. 
Marcussen, Tor, "«Requiem» til gjensidig trøst", Aftenposten'', 30 October 2007

20th-century Norwegian organists
21st-century Norwegian organists
Male organists
Norwegian composers
Norwegian male composers
1949 births
Musicians from Skien
ECM Records artists
Spellemannprisen winners
Living people
Grappa Music artists
Norwegian male pianists
21st-century pianists
20th-century Norwegian male musicians
21st-century Norwegian male musicians